The Vulgate is a fourth-century translation of the Gospels and of most of the Old Testament into Latin produced by St. Jerome.

Vulgate may also refer to:

Christianity

Official Catholic Latin editions
Sixtine Vulgate, an edition of the Vulgate prepared and promulgated by Pope Sixtus V in 1590
Sixto-Clementine Vulgate, a revision of Sixtus V's edition of the Vulgate; promulgated by Pope Clement VII in 1592
Nova Vulgata, edition of the Vulgate promulgated in 1979 by Pope John Paul II

Other editions
 One of the critical editions of the Vulgate

Miscellaneous 
Vetus Latina, Latin translation of the Septuagint pre-dating the fourth-century translation of St. Jerome
Greek Vulgate, an expression with various meanings

Literature

Antiquity 
 Vulgate, in Homeric scholarship, the precedent texts to the current versions of the Iliad and the Odyssey
 Vulgate, accounts of the life and times of Alexander the Great based on the Cleitarchus' lost History of Alexander; parts of it are found in:
Quintus Curtius Rufus' "Histories of Alexander the Great"
Plutarch, "Life of Alexander"
Diodorus Siculus, Book 17
Gnaeus Pompeius Trogus, "Philippic History," Books 11-12
 Justin (historian), Historia Philippicae et Totius Mundi Origines et Terrae Situs, Books 11-12

Arthurian legend
Vulgate Cycle, also known as the Lancelot-Grail, a major source of Arthurian legend written in French
Post-Vulgate Cycle, a rewriting of the Lancelot-Grail

See also 

 Book of Kells
Textus Receptus